Étangs de Vaux et de Baye is a group of lakes in Nièvre, Burgundy, France. At an elevation of 235 m, their surface area is 2.2 km2.

External links

Vaux Baye